Torrian Wilson (born November 28, 1991) is an American football guard who is currently a free agent. He played college football at UCF. After not being selected in the 2015 NFL Draft, he was signed by the Detroit Lions as an undrafted free agent. Wilson is also a lineman trainer and is actively working with NFL, high school, and college recruits.

Early years and high school career
Torrian Wilson was born in Miami, Florida, to Earnest and Vernell Wilson. He attended Miami Northwestern Senior High School, where he played both offense and defense for head football coach Billy Rolle. He was a first-team all-state pick and an All-Dade County selection. At the end of his senior season he was selected to play in the 2010 Under Armour All-America Game. Considered a four-star recruit by Rivals.com, Wilson was the eighth ranked offensive guard in the nation. He was recruited by Alabama, UCF, Louisiana State, Louisville, Michigan and Stanford.

College career
Wilson attended the University of Central Florida, where he  redshirted his freshman year. In 2011, as a redshirt freshman, he appeared in 11 contests, started four games at left tackle and was selected to the C-USA All-Freshman Team. In his sophomore season he started all 14 games at left tackle and was selected to the All-C-USA Second-team. In 2013, he started 11 games at LT. As a senior, he started all 13 games at left tackle and was named to the All-AAC Second-team.

Professional career

Detroit Lions
After not being selected in the 2015 NFL Draft, Wilson was signed by the Detroit Lions as an undrafted free agent on May 7, 2015. He received a $11,000 signing bonus by the Lions. He was released by the team on September 5, 2015.

New England Patriots
On November 10, 2015, the New England Patriots signed Torrian Wilson to their practice squad. Wilson was released by the Patriots on January 13, 2016.

Orlando Predators
On March 9, 2016, Wilson was activated by the Orlando Predators.

References

1991 births
Living people
Miami Northwestern Senior High School alumni
UCF Knights football players
New England Patriots players
Detroit Lions players
Players of American football from Miami
Orlando Predators players